Kháng, also known as Mang U’, is an Austroasiatic language of Vietnam. It is closely related to the Bumang language of southern Yunnan, China.

Classification
Paul Sidwell (2014) classifies Khang as Palaungic, although Jerold Edmondson (2010) suggests it is Khmuic.

Kháng is most closely related to Bumang (Edmondson 2010).

Distribution
Kháng speakers are an officially recognized ethnic group in Vietnam, and officially numbered 10,272 in 1999.

The Kháng are distributed in the following districts of northwest Vietnam in Sơn La Province and Lai Châu Province:

Sơn La Province (along the Black River)
Thuận Châu (including Bản Ná Lai village)
Quỳnh Nhai
Mường La
Lai Châu Province
Phong Thổ
Mường Tè
Than Uyên
Điện Biên Province
Mường Lay (alternatively Mường Chà)
Tuần Giáo

References

Further reading
Dao, Jie 刀洁. 2007. Bumang yu yanjiu 布芒语研究 [A study of Bumang]. Beijing: Minzu University.
Ferlus, Michel. 1996. Langues et peuples viet-muong [Viet-Muong languages and peoples]. Mon-Khmer Studies Journal (MKS) 26. 7–28
Mikami, Naomitsu. 2003. "A Khang phonology and wordlist." Reports on Minority Languages in Mainland Southeast Asia, ed. by Ueda Hiromi, 1–42. Endangered Languages of the Pacific Rim. Osaka: Faculty of Informatics, Osaka Gakuin University.
Schliesinger, Joachim. 1998. Hill tribes of Vietnam. Vol. Vol. 2. 2 vols. Bangkok: White Lotus Co. Ltd.
Tạ, Quang Tùng. 2023. Ngữ âm tiếng Kháng và phương án chữ viết cho người Kháng ở Việt Nam. Thái Nguyên: Nhà xuất bản đại học Thái Nguyên.
Thông Tấn Xã Việt Nam [Vietnam News Agency]. 2006. Việt Nam Hình Ảnh Cộng Dồng 54 Dân Tộc [Vietnam Image of the Community of 54 Ethnic Groups]. Hanoi: The Vna Publishing House.

External links
https://web.archive.org/web/20131202221448/http://cema.gov.vn/modules.php?name=Content&op=details&mid=508
http://projekt.ht.lu.se/rwaai RWAAI (Repository and Workspace for Austroasiatic Intangible Heritage)
http://hdl.handle.net/10050/00-0000-0000-0003-93F5-2@view Khang in RWAAI Digital Archive

Khmuic languages
Palaungic languages
Languages of Vietnam